The Re-Creation of Brian Kent is a 1925 American drama film directed by Sam Wood and written by Mary Alice Scully and Arthur F. Statter. It is based on the 1919 novel The Re-Creation of Brian Kent by Harold Bell Wright. The film stars Kenneth Harlan, Helene Chadwick, Mary Carr, ZaSu Pitts, Rosemary Theby, T. Roy Barnes, Ralph Lewis, and Russell Simpson. The film was released on February 15, 1925, by Principal Distributing.

Plot
To satisfy all the wishes of a demanding wife, Brian Kent steals a large sum from the bank where he works. Overwhelmed with remorse, the man then attempts suicide on a boat that is adrift in a tumultuous river. The small boat, however, ends up entangled in the branches of the willows along the shore and Brian meets Judy, a girl who lives nearby and who introduces him to her aunt Sue. The latter, a kind teacher, has a positive influence on Brian who, trying to leave the past behind, becomes another man and even begins to write a book. But when he falls in love with Betty Jo, he arouses jealousy in Judy, who tells her father about her less than exemplary past. The man informs the bank of Brian's whereabouts, but Aunt Sue manages to persuade the bank president - an old student of his - not to pursue him. His wife, who came to find him, drowns in the river and Brian is now free to start a happy life with Betty Jo.

Cast

Preservation
The film is preserved in the Library of Congress collection.

See also
Wild Brian Kent (1936)

References

External links

 
 

1925 films
1920s English-language films
Silent American drama films
1925 drama films
Films directed by Sam Wood
American silent feature films
American black-and-white films
Films based on American novels
1920s American films